Nagórze may refer to the following places in Poland:
Nagórze, Lower Silesian Voivodeship (south-west Poland)
Nagórze, West Pomeranian Voivodeship (north-west Poland)
Nagórze, Lesser Poland Voivodeship (south Poland)